This is a list of intelligence agencies by country. It includes only currently operational institutions.

An intelligence agency is a government agency responsible for the collection, analysis, and exploitation of information in support of law enforcement, national security, military, and foreign policy objectives.

Afghanistan 

General Directorate of Intelligence (GDI) – د استخباراتو لوی ریاست

Albania 

State Intelligence Service (SHISH) – Sherbimi Informativ Shteteror

Argentina 

President's Office
Federal Intelligence Agency (AFI) – Agencia Federal de Inteligencia
Directorate of Judicial Surveillance (DOJ) – Dirección de Observaciones Judiciales
Federal Counternarcotics Service (SEFECONAR) – Servicio Federal de Lucha contra el Narcotráfico
Argentine National Gendarmerie Intelligence (SIGN) – Inteligencia de la Gendarmería Nacional Argentina
Ministry of Defense
National Directorate of Strategic Military Intelligence (DNIEM) – Dirección Nacional de Inteligencia Estratégica Militar
Ministry of Justice
Federal Penitentiary Service Intelligence – Inteligencia del Servicio Penitenciario Federal
Airport Security Police Intelligence – Inteligencia de la Policía de Seguridad Aeroportuaria
Ministry of Interior
National Directorate of Criminal Intelligence (DNIC) – Dirección Nacional de Inteligencia Criminal
Argentine Federal Police Intelligence – Inteligencia de la Policía Federal Argentina
Buenos Aires Police Intelligence (SIPBA) (Buenos Aires Police Intelligence) – Inteligencia de la Policía Bonaerense
Argentine Naval Prefecture Intelligence (SIPN) – Inteligencia de la Prefectura Naval Argentina
Ministry of Economy
Financial Intelligence Unit (UIF) – Unidad de Inteligencia Financiera
Intelligence Department of the Joint General Staff of the Armed Forces (J-2)
Military Intelligence Collection Center (CRIM) – Central de Reunión de Inteligencia Militar
Army Intelligence Service (SIE) – Servicio de Inteligencia del Ejército
Naval Intelligence Service (SIN) – Servicio de Inteligencia Naval
Air Force Intelligence Service (SIFA) – Servicio de Inteligencia de la Fuerza Aérea

Armenia 

National Security Service (NSS)

Australia 

Australian Security Intelligence Organisation (ASIO)
Australian Secret Intelligence Service (ASIS)
Australian Signals Directorate (ASD)
Australian Geospatial-Intelligence Organisation (AGO)
Defence Intelligence Organisation (DIO)
Office of National Intelligence (ONI)

Austria 

 Bundesministerium für Landesverteidigung (BMLV): Federal Ministry of Defence
 Heeresnachrichtenamt (HNA): Army Intelligence Office
 Abwehramt (AbwA): Counter-Intelligence Office 
Bundesministerium für Inneres (BMI): Federal Ministry of the Interior
 Direktion Staatsschutz und Nachrichtendienst (DSN): State Security and Intelligence Directorate

Azerbaijan 

State Security Service (Dövlət Təhlükəsizliyi Xidməti)
Foreign Intelligence Service (Xarici Kəşfiyyat Xidməti)
Financial Monitoring Service (Maliyyə Monitorinqi Xidməti)

Bahamas 

Security and Intelligence Branch (SIB)
Financial Intelligence Unit (FIU)

Bahrain 

 NSA – National Security Agency

Bangladesh 

 National Committee for Intelligence Coordination
National Security Affairs Cell
External Intelligence
Directorate General of Forces Intelligence (DGFI)
 National Security Intelligence (NSI)
Internal Intelligence
National Security Intelligence (NSI)
 Special Branch (SB)
 Detective Branch (DB)
 Police Bureau of Investigation (PBI)
 Criminal Investigation Department (CID)
 Counter Terrorism and Transnational Crime (CTTC)
 National Telecommunication Monitoring Centre (NTMC)
 Digital Security Agency
Economic Intelligence & Securities
 Central Intelligence Unit (CIU)
 Bangladesh Financial Intelligence Unit (BFIU)
Other Intelligence
 Special Security Force – Intelligence Bureau (SSF-IB)
 Rapid Action Battalion – Intelligence Wing (RAB-IW)
Military Intelligence
 Directorate General of Forces Intelligence (DGFI)
 Counter Terrorism and Intelligence Bureau (CTIB)

Barbados 

Financial Intelligence Unit (FIU)
Criminal Investigations Department (CID)

Belarus 

Камітэт дзяржаўнай бяспекі / Комитет государственной безопасности (KDB/KGB) (State Security Committee)

Belgium 

VSSE (State Security Service)
ADIV / SGRS (ADIV/SGRS) (General Intelligence and Security Service, military intelligence)

Bosnia and Herzegovina 

Intelligence-Security Agency of Bosnia and Herzegovina (OSA)
Državna Agencija za Istrage i Zaštitu (State Investigation and Protection Agency, SIPA)

Botswana 

Directorate on Intelligence and Security Services (DISS – Ministry of State President Espionage & Counter Intelligence unit)

Brazil 

Brazilian Intelligence Agency (ABIN)
Federal Police Department (DPF) (counterintelligence agency)
 Gabinete de Segurança Institucional (Institutional Security Bureau) (GSI) Responds directly to the president's office and the armed forces. Coordinates some intelligence operations.
Secretaria da Receita Federal do Brasil (Federal Revenue Secretariat) (RFB)  (General Coordination for Research and Investigations - Coordenação-Geral de Pesquisa e Investigação - Copei)

Brunei 

Internal Security Department (Brunei)  (internal)
Research Department  (external)

Bulgaria 

 State Intelligence Agency (Държавна агенция „Разузнаване“ (DAR)) – overseas intelligence gathering service under the supervision of the Council of Ministers of Bulgaria
State Agency for National Security (Държавна агенция за национална сигурност (DANS)) – national security service under the supervision of the Council of Ministers of Bulgaria

Burundi 

 Service national de renseignement (SNR)

Canada 

Canadian Security Intelligence Service (CSIS)
Communications Security Establishment (CSE)
Canadian Forces Intelligence Command (DND)
Criminal Intelligence Service Canada (CISC)
Financial Transactions and Reports Analysis Centre of Canada (FINTRAC)
Global Affairs Canada (GAC) Bureau of Intelligence Analysis and Security and Bureau of Economic Intelligence
Royal Canadian Mounted Police (RCMP) Intelligence Division
Canada Border Services Agency (CBSA) Immigrations Intelligence
Canadian Coast Guard (CCG)

Chad 

 Agence nationale de sécurité (ANS)

Chile 

Ministry of Interior
National Intelligence Agency (ANI) – Agencia Nacional de Inteligencia

People's Republic of China 

Central Committee of the Chinese Communist Party (CCCPC)
 610 Office
 International Department (ID)
 United Front Work Department (UFWD)
People's Liberation Army (PLA)
 Joint Staff Department of the Central Military Commission (JSDCMC)
 Intelligence Bureau of the General Staff aka 2nd Bureau
 People's Liberation Army Air Force (PLAAF)
 People's Liberation Army General Political Department (GND)
 People's Liberation Army General Staff Department (GSD)
 People's Liberation Army Strategic Support Force, particularly the 3rd department ("3PLA").
 PLA Unit 61398 aka APT 1 
State Council of the People's Republic of China
 Ministry of Human Resources and Social Security (MOHRSS)
 State Administration of Foreign Experts Affairs (SAFEA)
 Ministry of Public Security (MPS)
 Ministry of State Security (MSS)
 Office for Safeguarding National Security of the CPG in the HKSAR (CPGNSO)

Colombia 

Dirección Nacional de Inteligencia (DNI)

Democratic Republic of the Congo 

National Intelligence Agency (ANR)
General Staff of Military intelligence (ex-DEMIAP)

Croatia 

Sigurnosno-obavještajna agencija (SOA) (Security and Intelligence Agency)
Vojna sigurnosno-obavještajna agencija (VSOA) (Military Security and Intelligence Agency)

Cuba 

Communist Party of Cuba (PCC)
Ministry of the FAR (MINFAR)
Military Counterintelligence Directorate
Ministry of the Interior
Dirección General de Inteligencia (DGI)

Cyprus 

Cyprus Intelligence Service (CIS) (Κυπριακή Υπηρεσία Πληροφοριών)(ΚΥΠ), (former Central Intelligence Service-KYP)

Czech Republic 

Security Information Service (Bezpečnostní informační služba, BIS)
Office for Foreign Relations and Information (Úřad pro zahraniční styky an informace, ÚZSI)
Ministry of Defence
Military Intelligence (Vojenské zpravodajství, VZ)

Denmark 

Danish Security and Intelligence Service (Politiets Efterretningstjeneste (PET)).
Danish Defence Intelligence Service (Forsvarets Efterretningstjeneste (FE)).
Army Intelligence Center (Efterretningsregimentet (EFR)).

Ecuador 

 National Intelligence Secretariat (SENAIN) (Inactive)

Egypt 

Gihaz al-Mukhabarat al-Amma (GIS) (General Intelligence Service)
Idarat al-Mukhabarat al-Harbyya wa al-Istitla (OMIR) (Office of Military Intelligence and Reconnaissance)
Al-amn al-Watani (HS) (Homeland Security)

Eritrea 

National Security Office

Estonia 

Estonian Internal Security Service (KaPo) (Kaitsepolitseiamet)
Foreign Intelligence Service (Välisluureamet)

Ethiopia 

Information Network Security Administration (INSA)
National Intelligence and Security Service (NISS)

Finland 

Ministry of Defence
Finnish Defence Intelligence Agency – Puolustusvoimien tiedustelulaitos (PVTIEDL) / Försvarsmaktens underrättelsetjänst
Defense Command Intelligence Division – Pääesikunnan tiedusteluosasto (PE TIEDOS) / Huvudstabens underrättelseavdelning)
Ministry of Interior
Finnish Security Intelligence Service (SUPO) – Suojelupoliisi / Skyddspolisen

France 

 President of France
 National Centre for Counter Terrorism (CNRLT, Coordination nationale du renseignement et de la lutte contre le terrorisme)
Ministry of Interior
General Directorate for Internal Security (DGSI; Direction générale de la sécurité intérieure) – Domestic counter-terrorism and counter-espionage intelligence.
 National Police 
 Central Directorate of Public Security
 Service central du renseignement territorial (SCRT)
Central Directorate of the Judicial Police (DCPJ; Direction centrale de la Police judiciaire) – Organised crime intelligence.
 Sous-direction anti-terroriste (SDAT)
 Ministry of Defence
Directorate-General for External Security (DGSE; Direction générale de la sécurité extérieure) – Foreign intelligence relating to national security.
Direction du Renseignement et de la Sécurité de la Défense (DRSD; Direction du Renseignement et de la Sécurité de la Défense) – Foreign intelligence relating to national security.
Directorate of Military Intelligence (DRM; Direction du renseignement militaire) – Military intelligence.
 Ministry of Finance
 Tracfin
 Direction Nationale du Renseignement et des Enquêtes Douanières (DNRED)

Gambia 

State Intelligence Services (the Gambia) (SIS)

Georgia 

State Security Service (SSSG) − სახელმწიფო უშიშროების სამსახური
Georgian Intelligence Service (GIS) − საქართველოს დაზვერვის სამსახური
Georgian Armed Forces
Military Intelligence Department

Germany

Federal 
Bundeskanzleramt: Federal Chancellery
Bundesnachrichtendienst (BND): Federal Intelligence Service
Bundesministerium des Innern (BMI): Federal Ministry of Interior
Bundesamt für Verfassungsschutz (BfV): Federal Office for the Protection of the Constitution
Bundesamt für Sicherheit in der Informationstechnik (BSI): Federal Office for Information Security
Bundespolizei: Federal Police
Zentrum für Informations- und Kommunikationstechnik (IKTZ): Center for information and communication technology
Bundeswehr: Federal Defense Force
Militärischer Abschirmdienst (MAD): Military Counterintelligence Service

State 
Landesministerium des Innern: State Ministry of the Interior (different denominations from state to state)
Landesamt für Verfassungsschutz (LfV): (semi-independent) State Authority for the Protection of the Constitution for every single state

Ghana 

Bureau of National Investigations (BNI) – (Internal Intelligence Agency)

Greece 

Prime Minister of the Hellenic Republic
National Intelligence Service (ΕΥΠ) – Εθνική Υπηρεσία Πληροφοριών
Hellenic National Defence General Staff
E Division – Intelligence Division

Haiti 

 Service d'Intelligence National (SIN) (National Intelligence Service)

Hungary 

Információs Hivatal (IH) (Information Office)
Alkotmányvédelmi Hivatal (AH) (Constitution Protection Office)
Terrorelhárítási Központ (TEK) (Counter Terrorism Centre)

Iceland 

National Security Agency – Greiningardeild Ríkislögreglustjóra (GRLS) 
Military Intelligence Service – Greiningardeild Varnarmálastofnunar Íslands (GVMSÍ)

India 

External Intelligence
Research and Analysis Wing (RAW)
Defence Intelligence
Defence Intelligence Agency
Directorate of Military Intelligence
Directorate of Air Intelligence
Directorate of Naval Intelligence
Joint Cipher Bureau
Internal intelligence
Intelligence Bureau (IB)

Economic Intelligence
Directorate of Revenue Intelligence
Economic Intelligence Council
Enforcement Directorate
Directorate General of GST Intelligence (DGGI)

Indonesia 

Foreign/Domestic Intelligence
State Intelligence Agency - (Badan Intelijen Negara (BIN))
Military Intelligence
Indonesian Army Intelligence Centre (PUSINTELAD) 
Signals Intelligence
National Cyber and Crypto Agency - (Badan Siber dan Sandi Negara (BSSN)) 
Criminal Intelligence
Deputy Attorney General on Intelligence (Under the Attorney General's Office) - (Jaksa Agung Muda Bidang Intelijen Kejagung (JAM Intel)
(Directorate of Immigration Intelligence) - (Direktorat Intelijen Imigrasi)  
National Narcotics Agency Intelligence Section) - (Seksi Intelijen BNN)
Financial Intelligence
Customs & Excise Sub-Directorate of Intelligence - (Sub Direktorat Intelijen Dirjen Bea Cukai)
Indonesian Financial Transaction Reports and Analysis Center - (Pusat Pelaporan dan Analisis Transaksi Keuangan (PPATK))

Iran 

Ministry of Intelligence (VAJA) 
Oghab 2 – Nuclear facilities security
Council for Intelligence Coordination

Islamic Republic of Iran Army:
Intelligence Protection Organization of Iranian Army (SAHEFAJA)

Islamic Revolutionary Guard Corps:
Intelligence Organization of IRGC
Intelligence Protection Organization of IRGC (SAHEFASA)
 FARAJA
Intelligence org

Iraq 

General Security Directorate - (GSD) - (Internal security agency)
Iraqi National Intelligence Service - (INIS) - (Foreign intelligence and Special operations)
Falcons Intelligence Cell - (FIC) - (Military intelligence)
Kurdistan Region Security Council (KRSC) - (Regional security agency)
Intelligence and Counter-Terrorism Directorate - Ministry of Interior

Ireland 

Foreign & Domestic Military Intelligence (Defence Forces)
Directorate of Military Intelligence (G2)
Communications and Information Services Corps (CIS) SIGINT Section
Domestic Police Intelligence (Garda Síochána)
Crime & Security Branch (CSB)
Special Detective Unit (SDU)
National Surveillance Unit (NSU)
Financial Intelligence Unit (FIU)

Israel 

Mossad (Foreign Intelligence and Special Operations)
Shin Bet (Internal Security Service)
Aman (Military intelligence)
Lahav 433 (Police intelligence)

Italy 

Dipartimento delle Informazioni per la Sicurezza (DIS) - Department of Information for Security
Internal Intelligence:
Agenzia Informazioni e Sicurezza Interna (AISI) - Agency for Internal Information and Security
External Intelligence:
Agenzia Informazioni e Sicurezza Esterna (AISE) - Agency for External Information and Security
Military Intelligence:
Centro Intelligence Interforze (CII) - Joint Intelligence Center

Japan 

Cabinet Secretariat
Cabinet Intelligence and Research Office (CIRO) 
Ministry of Defense
Defense Intelligence Headquarters (DIH)
Ministry of Justice
Public Security Intelligence Agency (PSIA)

Jordan 

General Intelligence Department (GID) - (Da’irat al-Mukhabarat al-’Ammah)

Kenya 

 National Intelligence Service(NIS) 
 Directorate of Criminal Investigation(DCI)
 Military Intelligence(MI)

North Korea 

Reconnaissance General Bureau
Ministry of State Security

South Korea 

National Intelligence Service (NIS)
Ministry of National Defense (MND)
Defense Intelligence Agency (DIA)
Defense Counterintelligence Command (DCC)

Kyrgyzstan 

 State Committee for National Security (UKMK/GKNB)

Lebanon 

 General Directorate of General Security
 The Information Branch
 Lebanese State Security

Liberia 

 National Security Agency

Lithuania 

State Security Department - (Valstybes saugumo departamentas (VSD))
Second Investigation Department - (Antrasis operatyvinių tarnybų departamentas (AOTD))

Luxembourg 

Luxembourg State Intelligence Service - (Service de Renseignement de l'État Luxembourgeois)

Madagascar 

Central Intelligence Service (CIS)

Malaysia 

Royal Intelligence Corps (Kor Risik DiRaja) 
Malaysian Defence Intelligence Organisation
Research Division of the Prime Minister's Department (Malaysian External Intelligence Organization)
Chief Government Security Office
Malaysian Special Branch

Mexico 

Federal government of Mexico
Civilian agencies
Attorney General of Mexico (FGR)
Crime-Combat Planning, Analysis and Information Center (CENAPI / PGR – Centro de Planeación, Análisis e Información para el Combate a la Delincuencia)
Assistant Attorney General's Office for Special Investigations on Organized Crime (SEIDO / PGR)
Secretariat of the Interior (SEGOB)
National Commission for Security (CNS)
Mexican Federal Police
Intelligence Division of the Federal Police (Division de Inteligencia – CNS / Policia Federal)
National Intelligence Centre (CNI)
Military agencies
Secretariat of National Defense (SEDENA)
2nd Section of the National Defense Intelligence Staff (SEDENA S-2 – Seccion 2da: Inteligencia del Estado Mayor)
Military Intelligence – National Defense Ministry (Inteligencia Militar – SEDENA / Ejercito y Fuerza Aerea)
Mexican Navy
Naval Intelligence - (Inteligencia Naval / SEMAR / Marina Armada)

Moldova 

 Information and Security Service (SIS)

Mongolia 

General Intelligence Agency of Mongolia (GIA)

Montenegro 

National Security Agency (ANB)

Morocco 

General Directorate for Territorial Surveillance - Direction de la Surveillance du Territoire (DST) 
Directorate of Research and Documentation - Direction Generale pour l'Etude et la Documentation (DGED)

Myanmar 

Bureau Of Special Investigation (BSI)
Military Intelligence of Myanmar (MI)
Special Intelligence Department (SID)

Namibia 
Namibia Central Intelligence Service (NCIS)

Nepal 

Directorate of Military Intelligence (DMI)
National Investigation Department (NID)

Netherlands 

General Intelligence and Security Service - Algemene Inlichtingen en Veiligheidsdienst (AIVD)
Military Intelligence and Security Service - Militaire Inlichtingen en Veiligheidsdienst (MIVD) 
Joint Sigint Cyber Unit (JSCU)
National Coordinator for Counterterrorism and Security - Nationaal Coördinator Terrorismebestrijding en Veiligheid (NCTV)
Royal Marechaussee - Koninklijke Marechaussee 
Team Criminal Intelligence (KMar-TCI)
Fiscal Information and Investigation Service - Fiscale Inlichtingen en Opsporingsdienst (FIOD-ECD)
Team Criminal Intelligence (FIOD-TCI)

New Zealand 

Government Communications Security Bureau
New Zealand Security Intelligence Service
National Assessments Bureau

Nigeria 

National Intelligence Agency (Foreign Intelligence and Counterintelligence)
Defence Intelligence Agency (Military Intelligence)
State Security Service (Internal Security)

North Macedonia 

Administration for Security and Counterintelligence (Uprava za bezbednost i kontrarazuznavanje) (Police Agency)
Intelligence Agency (Agencija za Razuznavanje) (Civilian Agency) IA
Military Service for Security and Intelligence (Voena služba za razuznuvanje i bezbednost) (Military Agency)

Norway 

Nasjonal sikkerhetsmyndighet (NSM) (National Security Authority)
Politiets sikkerhetstjeneste (PST) (Police Security Service)
Etterretningstjenesten (NIS) (Norwegian Intelligence Service)
Forsvarets sikkerhetstjeneste (FOST) – Norwegian Defence Security Service (NORDSS)

Oman 

 The Palace Office
 Internal Security Service

Pakistan 

National Intelligence Coordination Committee (NICC)
External Intelligence
 Inter-Services Intelligence (ISI)
Defence Intelligence
 Air Intelligence (AI)
 Military Intelligence (MI)
 Naval Intelligence (NI)
Internal Intelligence
 Intelligence Bureau (IB)
 Federal Investigation Agency (FIA)
 National Counter Terrorism Authority (NACTA)
 Counter Terrorism Department (CTD)
 National Intelligence Directorate (NID)
Economic Intelligence & Securities
 Federal Board of Revenue (FBR)
 Directorate-General of Intelligence and Investigation (DGII)
 Financial Monitoring Unit (FMU)
 National Accountability Bureau (NAB)
 Security and Exchange Commission Pakistan (SECP)
Other Intelligence
 Anti-Narcotics Force (ANF)
 National Crises Management Cell (NCMC)

Palestine 

 Palestinian Security Services
 Palestinian Preventive Security (internal security)
 Palestinian National Security Forces

Panama 

National Police Intelligence Directorate (DNIP) – Dirección Nacional de Inteligencia Policial
General Directorate of Analysis and Strategic Intelligence - Direccion General de Analisis e Inteligencia Estrategica (DGAIE) 
National Intelligence and Security Service - Servicio Nacional de Inteligencia y Seguridad (SENIS)

Papua New Guinea 

National Intelligence Organization (NIO)

Peru 

National Directorate of Intelligence - Dirección Nacional de Inteligencia (DINI)

Philippines 

Office of the President – Tanggapan ng Pangulo ng Pilipinas
National Intelligence Coordinating Agency (NICA) – Pambansang Ahensiya sa Ugnayang Intelihensiya
Philippine Drug Enforcement Agency (PDEA) – Ahensiya ng Pilipinas sa Pagpapatupad ng Batas Laban sa Bawal na Gamot
National Counter-Terrorism Action Group (NACTAG) – Pambansang Lupon ng Pagsasagawa Laban sa Terorismo
Department of Justice – Kagawaran ng Katarungan
National Bureau of Investigation (NBI) – Pambansang Kawanihan ng Pagsisiyasat
Department of National Defense – Kagawaran ng Tanggulang Pambansa
Intelligence Service, Armed Forces of the Philippines (ISAFP)
Philippine Army – Hukbong Katihan ng Pilipinas
Army Intelligence Regiment (AIR)
Philippine Air Force – Hukbong Himpapawid ng Pilipinas
300th Air Intelligence and Security Wing (AISW)
Philippine Navy – Hukbong Dagat ng Pilipinas
Naval Intelligence and Security Force (NISF)
Department of Transportation – Kagawaran ng Transportasyon
Philippine Coast Guard – Tanod Baybayin ng Pilipinas
Coast Guard Staff for Intelligence
Department of the Interior and Local Government – Kagawaran ng Interyor at Pamahalaang Lokal
Philippine National Police – Pambansang Pulisya ng Pilipinas
Directorate for Intelligence (DI)
Philippine National Police – Intelligence Group (PNP-IG)
 Philippine National Police – Criminal Investigation and Detection Group (PNP-CIDG)
Department of Finance – Kagawaran ng Pananalapi
Bureau of Customs (BuCor) – Kawanihan ng Adwana
Customs Intelligence and Investigation Service (CIIS)
Department of Foreign Affairs – Kagawaran ng Ugnayang Panlabas
Intelligence and Security Unit (ISU)

Poland 

Foreign Intelligence Agency - Agencja Wywiadu (AW)
Internal Security Agency - Agencja Bezpieczeństwa Wewnętrznego (ABW) 
Military Counter-intelligence Service - Służba Kontrwywiadu Wojskowego (SKW)
Operations and Investigations Directorate of the Border Guard Headquarters - Zarząd Operacyjno-Śledczy Komendy Głównej Straży Granicznej (KGSG, ZOŚ, KGSG)

Portugal 

Intelligence System of the Portuguese Republic - Sistema de Informações da República Portuguesa (SIRP) 
Security Intelligence Service - Serviço de Informações de Segurança (SIS) 
Defense Strategic Intelligence Service - Serviço de Informações Estratégicas de Defesa (SIED) 
Military Intelligence and Security Service - Centro de Informações e Segurança Militares (CISMIL)

Qatar 

Qatar State Security

Romania 

 Romanian Intelligence Service (SRI) – Serviciul Român de Informații
 Foreign Intelligence Service (SIE) – Serviciul de Informații Externe
Special Telecommunication Service (STS) – Serviciul de Telecomunicații Speciale
Ministry of National Defence
General Directorate for Defense Intelligence (DGIA) – Direcția Generală de Informații a Apărării
Ministry of Internal Affairs
General Directorate for Internal Security (DGPI) – Direcția Generală de Protecție Internă

Russia 

 Federal Security Service (FSB) – Федеральная служба безопасности
 Main Directorate of Special Programs of the President of the Russian Federation (GUSP) – Главное управление специальных программ Президента Российской Федерации
 Foreign Intelligence Service (Russia) (SVR) – Служба Внешней Разведки
 Main Intelligence Directorate (GRU) – Главное Разведывательное Управление
 Federal Protective Service (FSO) – Федеральная служба охраны
Special Communications Service of Russia – Служба специальной связи и информации

Saudi Arabia 

 Council of Political and Security Affairs (CPSA) – مجلس الشؤون السياسية والأمنية
 General Intelligence Presidency (GIP) – رئاسة الاستخبارات العامة
 Presidency of State Security (PSS) – رئاسة أمن الدولة
 Mabahith (GDI) – المباحث العامة
 Saudi Arabia Ministry of Defense (MOD) – وزارة الدفاع
 Saudi Arabia Border Guards Intelligence Directorate – استخبارات حرس الحدود
 The National Cyber Security Commission (NCSC) – الهيئة الوطنية للأمن السيبراني

Serbia 

Ministry of the Interior
Security Intelligence Agency (BIA) – Безбедносно-информативна агенција
Ministry of Defence
Military Intelligence Agency (VOA) – Војнообавештајна агенција
Military Security Agency (VBA) – Војнобезбедносна агенција
Intelligence and Reconnaissance Directorate (J-2) – Управа за обавештајно-извиђачке послове

Singapore 

Internal Security Department (ISD)
Security and Intelligence Division (SID)

Slovakia 

Slovak Information Service - Slovenská informačná služba (SIS)
Military Intelligence - Vojenské spravodajstvo
National Security Bureau - Národný bezpečnostný úrad (NBÚ)

Slovenia 

Slovenian Intelligence and Security Agency - Slovenska Obveščevalno-Varnostna Agencija (SOVA)
Intelligence and Security Service of Slovenian Ministry of Defence - Obveščevalno Varnostna Služba (OVS)
General Staff SAF – Section for intelligence matters – J2 - General štab SV – Sektor za obveščevalne zadeve – J2 (GŠSV-J2)

Somalia 

National Intelligence and Security Agency (NISA)

South Africa 

State Security Agency (SSA)
South African National Defence Force, Intelligence Division (SANDF-ID)
Crime Intelligence Division, South African Police Service

Spain 

Ministry of the Presidency
Department of Homeland Security (DSN)
Ministry of Defence
National Intelligence Centre (CNI)
National Cryptologic Center - (Centro Criptológico Nacional) (CCN)
Spanish Armed Forces
Armed Forces Intelligence Center (CIFAS)
Joint Cyberspace Command (MCCE)
Ministry of the Interior
Intelligence Center for Counter-Terrorism and Organized Crime - (Centro de Inteligencia contra el Terrorismo y el Crimen Organizado) (CITCO)
National Police Corps - (Cuerpo Nacional de Policia)
Technological Research Brigade (BIT)
General Commissariat of Information - (Comisaría General de la Información) (CGI)
General Commissariat of Judiciary Police - (Comisaría General de Policía Judicial) (CGPJ)

Sri Lanka 
Sri Lanka Police
State Intelligence Service
Special Branch
Terrorist Investigation Division
Criminal Investigation Department
Sri Lanka Army
Directorate of Military Intelligence
Military Intelligence Corps
Sri Lanka Navy
Department of Naval Intelligence
Sri Lanka Air Force
Directorate of Air Intelligence
Central Bank of Sri Lanka
Financial Intelligence Unit (Sri Lanka),

Sudan 

 General Intelligence Service

Sweden 

Swedish Military Intelligence and Security Service – Militära underrättelse - och säkerhetstjänsten (MUST)
Office for Special Acquisition – Kontoret för särskild inhämtning (KSI)
National Defence Radio Establishment – Försvarets Radioanstalt (FRA)
Swedish Security Service – Säkerhetspolisen (Säpo)

Switzerland 

Federal Department of Defence, Civil Protection and Sports
Federal Intelligence Service - Nachrichtendienst des Bundes (NDB) 
Swiss Armed Forces
Military Intelligence Service - Militärischer Nachrichtendienst (MND)

Syria 

National Security Bureau
Air Force Intelligence Directorate
General Intelligence Directorate
Political Security Directorate
Military Intelligence Service

Taiwan 

National Security Council (NSC)
National Security Bureau (NSB)
Ministry of Justice
Investigation Bureau (MJIB)
Ministry of the Interior
National Police Agency (NPA)
Ministry of Defense
Military Police Command (ROCMP)
Military Intelligence Bureau (MIB)

Tajikistan 

 State Committee for National Security (SCNS) – Кумитаи давлатии амнияти милли (КДАМ)/Государственный комитет национальной безопасности (ГКНБ)

Tanzania 

Tanzania Intelligence and Security Service (TISS)

Thailand 

Ministry of Foreign Affairs (MFA) 
News Division
Ministry of Interior (MOI)
Department of Provincial Administration (DOPA)
Internal Security Affairs Bureau (ISAB)
Ministry of Justice (MOJ)
Department of Special Investigation (DSI)
Bureau of Intelligence (BI)
Office of the Narcotics Control Board (ONCB)
Ministry of Defence (MOD)
Armed Forces Security Center (AFSC)
Army Military Intelligence Command (AMIC)
Department of Border Affair (DBA)
Directorate of Joint Intelligence (DJI)
Directorate of Intelligence Royal Thai Army (DINTRTA) 
Directorate of Intelligence, RTAF (INTELLRTAF)
Naval Intelligence Department (NID)
Office of the Prime Minister (OPM)
Anti-Money Laundering Office (AMLO)
Financial Intelligence Division (FID)
Internal Security Operations Command (ISOC) 
National Intelligence Agency (NIA)
National Intelligence Cooperating Center (NICC)
 Royal Thai Police (RTP)
Crime Suppression Division (CSD)
Drug Intelligence Division (DID)  
Special Branch Bureau (SBB)

Turkey 

President of Turkey
National Intelligence Organization (MİT)
 Ministry of National Defense
Joint Chief of Staff Intelligence Bureau (GENKUR-İDB)

Turkmenistan 

Ministry for National Security (MNS)

Ukraine 

 Central Intelligence DirectorateHolovne Upravlinnya Rozvidky (HUR)
 Foreign Intelligence Service of UkraineSluzhba Zovnishnioyi Rozvidky Ukrayiny (SZR or SZRU)
 National Bureau of Investigation (NBI)
 Security Service of Ukraine Sluzhba Bezpeky Ukrayiny (SBU)

United Arab Emirates 

 Signals Intelligence Agency (SIA)

United Kingdom 

Joint Intelligence Organisation (JIO) – Joint intelligence analysis.

Domestic intelligence
Security Service/MI5 – Domestic counter terrorism and counter espionage intelligence gathering and analysis.
Office for Security and Counter-Terrorism (OSCT) – Counter terrorism and protecting critical national infrastructure.
National Domestic Extremism and Disorder Intelligence Unit (NDEDIU) – Domestic counter extremism and public disorder intelligence gathering and analysis.
National Ballistics Intelligence Service (NBIS) – Illegal firearms intelligence analysis.
National Fraud Intelligence Bureau (NFIB) – Economic crime intelligence gathering and analysis.

Foreign intelligence
Secret Intelligence Service (SIS)/MI6 – Foreign intelligence gathering and analysis.
Defence Intelligence (DI) – Military intelligence analysis.

Signals intelligence
Government Communications Headquarters (GCHQ) – Signals intelligence gathering and analysis.

Criminal Intelligence and Protected Persons
National Crime Agency (NCA) – Organised crime intelligence gathering and analysis. Agency utilizes Unexplained wealth orders and the Investigatory Powers Act 2016. NCA officers are posted overseas in around 50 countries. They operate the UK Protected Persons Service, which includes witness protection.

Gangmasters and Labour Abuse Authority - Human trafficking, slavery, economic, and serious organised crime.

United States 

 Office of the Director of National Intelligence
 Independent agencies
 Central Intelligence Agency (CIA)
 United States Department of Defense
 Air Force Office of Special Investigations (AFOSI)
 Defense Intelligence Agency (DIA)
 Defense Counterintelligence and Security Agency
 National Security Agency (NSA)
 National Geospatial-Intelligence Agency (NGA)
 National Reconnaissance Office (NRO)
 Army Intelligence
 Marine Corps Intelligence
 Navy Intelligence
 Air Force Intelligence, Surveillance, and Reconnaissance Enterprise (USAF ISR)
 Space Force Intelligence, Surveillance, and Reconnaissance Enterprise (USSF ISR)
 United States Department of Energy
 Office of Intelligence and Counterintelligence (OICI)
 United States Department of Homeland Security
 Federal Protective Services
 Immigration Customs and Enforcement
 Customs and Border Protection
 United States Border Patrol
 Homeland Security Investigations
 United States Department of Justice
 Federal Bureau of Investigation (FBI)
 Office of National Security Intelligence (ONSI)
 United States Department of State
 Bureau of Intelligence and Research (IR)
 United States Department of the Treasury
 Office of Terrorism and Financial Intelligence (TFI)
 Drug Enforcement Administration
 Bureau of Alcohol, Tobacco, Firearms and Explosives
 United States Marshals Service

Uzbekistan 

State Security Service - Davlat Xavfsizlik Xizmati (DXX)/ Служба государственной безопасности (СГБ)

Venezuela 

Bolivarian National Intelligence Service - Servicio Bolivariano de Inteligencia (SEBIN) 
Directorate General of Military Intelligence – Dirección General de Contrainteligencia Militar (DGCIM)

Vietnam 

Ministry of National Defence
General Department of Defence Intelligence (GDDI)/General Department II - Tổng cục Tình báo Quốc phòng (TBQP)/Tổng cục II (TC2)

Yemen 

Political Security Organization (PSO)
National Security Bureau  (NSB)

Zimbabwe 

Central Intelligence Organisation (CIO)

European Union 

 European Union Intelligence Centre (EU INTCEN)
 Counter Terrorism Group (CTG)
 European Union Military Staff (EUMS)
 European Union Satellite Centre (EU SatCen)

Shanghai Cooperation Organisation 

 Regional Anti-Terrorist Structure (RATS)

See also 
 List of defunct intelligence agencies
 List of fictional secret police and intelligence organizations
 List of intelligence gathering disciplines
 List of law enforcement agencies
 List of protective service agencies
 List of secret police organizations
 List of counterintelligence organizations

References

External links 
 World Intelligence and Security Agencies, FAS
 Map: security services, Europe and the world

Lists by country